Michel Champagne (born 4 May 1956) was a member of the House of Commons of Canada. He was a businessman, political scientist and teacher by career.

Early political experience

Champagne was the mayor of Saint-Séverin-de-Proulxville from 1981 to his election for the progressive-conservative in 1984.

Member of the House of Commons

Champagne was among moderate supporters of the Quebec sovereignty movement, who gave a chance to the beau risque approach in the aftermath of the 1980 Quebec Referendum.

He successfully ran as a Progressive Conservative candidate in the Quebec riding of Champlain in the 1984 and was re-elected in 1988.  Champagne was a member in the 33rd and 34th Canadian Parliaments.

Champagne lost his bid for re-election in 1993, against Bloc Québécois candidate Réjean Lefebvre.

Provincial politics

Champagne ran for the Parti Québécois (PQ) nomination for the 2001 by-election in the district of Laviolette, with the backing of influential party insider and Cabinet Member Gilles Baril.  However, local PQ card-carrying supporters chose Yves Demers over him.  Demers eventually lost the election against Liberal Julie Boulet.

Return to municipal politics 

Michel Champagne ran again for the mayorship of Saint-Séverin in 2009 and he was re-elected without opposition during the municipal election. He became the mayor again 25 years after he left this position to enter federal politics.

Honors

Champagne served as President of the Festival Western de Saint-Tite in 1996 and he was the General Manager in 1997.

Footnotes

External links
 

1956 births
Living people
Members of the House of Commons of Canada from Quebec
Progressive Conservative Party of Canada MPs